The Gate District is a neighborhood of St. Louis, Missouri. The Gate District is defined as the area between Chouteau Avenue and Interstate 44 on the north and south and between South Jefferson Avenue and South Grand Boulevard on the east and west. This area is just south of the central corridor and west of Lafayette Square. The term Gate was added to define this neighborhood due to the number of ironclad gates lining the streets. Today, the neighborhood is the subject of increased gentrification.

Demographics
In 2020 The Gate District's racial makeup was 72.5% Black, 19.2% White, 0.1% Native American, 1.9% Asian, 5.1% Two or More Races, and 1.1% Some Other Race. 3.0% of the population was of Hispanic or Latino origin.

Neighborhoods
The Gate District is subdivided into four neighborhoods:
 Buder Park
 Eads Park
 Lafayette Terrace
 St. Vincent

References

Neighborhoods in St. Louis